The Tai'an Pumped Storage Power Station is a 1,000 MW pumped-storage hydroelectric power station located in the city of Tai'an in Shandong Province, China. Construction on the project began in February 2000 and the upper reservoir began to fill in May 2005. The four generators were commissioned between December 2005 and August 2007. The power station operates by shifting water between an upper and lower reservoir to generate electricity. The lower reservoir, Dahe Reservoir, was originally built in 1960 but repaired extensively for the project. The Tai'an Upper Reservoir is located in a valley above the east side of the lower reservoir. During periods of low energy demand, such as at night, water is pumped from Tai'an Lower Reservoir up to the upper reservoir. When energy demand is high, the water is released back down to the lower reservoir but the pump turbines that pumped the water up now reverse mode and serve as generators to produce electricity. The process is repeated as necessary and the plant serves as a peaking power plant. It is operated by State Grid Xinyuan Co.

See also

List of pumped-storage power stations

References

Dams completed in 2005
Energy infrastructure completed in 2007
Dams in China
Earth-filled dams
Concrete-face rock-fill dams
Hydroelectric power stations in Shandong
Pumped-storage hydroelectric power stations in China
2007 establishments in China
Underground power stations